The following is a list of video games developed and published by Sega. Included are all games published on their own platforms as well as platforms made by other manufacturers and PC. It does not include games made by third parties on Sega's platforms. Also included are games licensed by Sega, where they are involved as an IP holder but not otherwise. The corresponding year of each game refers to its original release year, localizations of titles can release years later.
 For games released on Sega's platforms see List of SG-1000 games, List of Sega Master System games, List of Sega Mega Drive and Sega Genesis games, List of Game Gear games, List of Sega Mega-CD games, List of Sega 32X games, List of Sega Saturn games and List of Dreamcast games
 For games released on Sega's arcade platforms see List of Sega arcade games
 For games released on mobile platforms see List of Sega mobile games
 For a list of franchises see List of Sega video game franchises
 For a list of games developed and published by Sega subsidiary Atlus, see List of Atlus games
 For a list of Sega development studios, see List of Sega development studios

Developed or published by Sega

Licensed by Sega

See also 

 Lists of Sega games
 List of Sega arcade games
 List of Sega Master System games
 List of Sega Mega Drive and Sega Genesis games
 List of Game Gear games
 List of Sega Mega-CD games
 List of Sega 32X games
 List of Sega Saturn games
 List of Dreamcast games

References

External links 
 Sega of Japan Products Page
 Sega of America Products Page

Sega
Video games